David Wolf may refer to:

David Wolf (astronaut) (born 1956), American astronaut 
David Wolf (ice hockey) (born 1989), German ice hockey player
David Wolf: Secret Agent, computer game developed by Dynamix, Inc.

See also
David Wolfe (disambiguation)